This is the discography of American singer-songwriter and producer David Hodges.

As performer

Solo
Musical Demonstrations Part 1 (2000)
Summit Worship (2000)
The Genesis Project (2003)
The Rising EP (2009)
The December Sessions Vol 1 (2011)
Passengers:Weapons EP (2013)
The December Sessions Vol 2 (2013)
Passengers:Sirens EP (2014)
The December Sessions Vol 3 (2015)
The December Sessions Vol 4 (2016)
The December Sessions Vol 5 (2017)
Discrepancies in the Recollection of Various Principles / Side A (2019)
Discrepancies in the Recollection of Various Principles / Side B (2019)
In The Round, One (2020)

Evanescence
Origin (2000)
Fallen (2003)
Anywhere but Home (2004)

Trading Yesterday/The Age of Information
The Beauty and the Tragedy (2004)
Everything is Broken (2007)
More Than This (completed 2006, released 2011)

AVOX
The Fragile World (2010)

Arrows To Athens
Kings & Thieves (2011)
Exile (2016)

As writer

As producer

Personnel
2003
Evanescence — Fallen (keyboards, piano, programming), string arrangement
2004
Kelly Clarkson  — Breakaway (arrangement, keyboards, piano)
2011
Christina Perri — Lovestrong (additional production, background vocals, percussion, piano, programming, shaker, vocal arrangement, vocals)

References

Production discographies
Country music discographies
Pop music discographies
Rock music discographies
Discographies of American artists